Vladimir Nakoryakov (26 July 1935 – 1 April 2018) was a Russian scientist in the fields of thermal physics and fluid dynamics. An academician of Russian Academy of Sciences, he joined the Communist Party of the Soviet Union in 1972, and was awarded the USSR State Prize in 1983.

Vladimir Nakoryakov was born in 1935 in Petrovsk-Zabaykalsky (now Zabaykalsky Krai). His father was executed in 1937. Nakoryakov graduated from Tomsk Polytechnic University. In 1982–1985 he was a chancellor of Novosibirsk State University. In 1985–1990 he was a vice-president of general committee of Siberian Division of USSR Academy of Sciences.

In 1986–1997 he was a president of Thermal physics Institution of Siberian Division of USSR Academy of Sciences (Russian Academy of Sciences). He became PhD in 1971 with his thesis "Heat-mass exchange in acoustic field".
Nakoryakov worked as a head of  chairs in Novosibirsk State University and Novosibirsk State Technical University.  He set down the fundamental basis for the theory of absorptive heat pump, elaborated a sequence of directions of ecologically clean power engineering and electricity-saving techniques. Also, he had been an expert in Nobel Committee for Physics and Chemistry for four years.

Recognition 
 Order of the Badge of Honour (1970)
 Order of the Red Banner of Labour (1982)
 USSR State Prize (1983)
 Order "For Merit to the Fatherland" (IV class) (1999)
 Order of Friendship (2007)
 Global Energy Prize (2007)

References

1935 births
2018 deaths
Academic staff of Novosibirsk State University
Academic staff of Novosibirsk State Technical University
Recipients of the Order of the Red Banner
Soviet physicists
20th-century Russian physicists
Recipients of the USSR State Prize
People from Zabaykalsky Krai
Scientists from Novosibirsk